

This is a list of the National Register of Historic Places listings in Houghton County, Michigan.

This is intended to be a complete list of the properties and districts on the National Register of Historic Places in Houghton County, Michigan, United States.  The locations of National Register properties and districts for which the latitude and longitude coordinates are included below, may be seen in a map.

There are 42 properties and districts listed on the National Register in the county, including 2 National Historic Landmarks.

History

Early history
Houghton County was created in 1845, and then encompassed the present-day Houghton County as well as Keweenaw County and Ontonagon County.

Copper mining
The history of Houghton County in inextricably linked with copper mining, and, indeed, nearly all of the NRHP-listed properties in the county are directly or indirectly linked to the mines.  The two most successful copper mines in the county were the Calumet and Hecla Mining Company and the Quincy Mine, both of which are now National Historic Landmarks.

Calumet and Hecla
The NHL Calumet Historic District includes a substantial proportion of the town of Calumet, Michigan, and the separately listed Calumet and Hecla Industrial District and Calumet Downtown Historic District.  The former covers many of the industrial mining buildings of the Calumet and Hecla Mining Company, while the latter covers the commercial portion of Calumet—the city was built substantially as a company town, and many of the buildings were constructed by, or with support from, Calumet and Hecla.  This was true also of the Calumet Fire Station and the Calumet Theatre.  The Keweenaw National Historical Park is also located primarily in Calumet.

In addition, the nearby town of Laurium, now a historic district, was populated substantially by executives and white-collar workers from the Calumet and Hecla.  Of particular note is the Thomas H. Hoatson House, built by mining executive Thomas H. Hoatson.

Quincy Mine
The other substantial mine in Houghton County was the Quincy Mine.  This NHL covers the mining property and nearby homes, as well as the significant Quincy Mine No. 2 Shaft Hoist House.  Another Quincy property, the Quincy Mining Company Stamp Mills, is also on the NRHP.

Like Calumet, the town of Hancock was also substantially a company town, this time of the Quincy Mine.  The affluent East Hancock was populated by mine employees and managers.

Other mines
Other properties on the register were associated with the copper mining industry in Houghton County.  These include the Smith-Dengler House, built by the Wolverine Copper Mining Company; the Redridge Steel and Log Dams, built as a joint project by the Atlantic Mining Company and the Baltic Mining Company; and the community of Painesdale, Michigan, built by the Champion Mining Company.

Commercial Houghton County
Many of the communities in Houghton County were mining towns, but these communities too required commercial and social structures.  The primarily commercial downtown districts of four Houghton County Communities are on the register: the Calumet Downtown Historic District mentioned above, the Lake Linden Historic District in Lake Linden, the Shelden Avenue Historic District in Houghton, and the Quincy Street Historic District in Hancock.  In addition to the districts, individual commercial buildings have been recognized for their historic importance: the Joseph Bosch Building in Lake Linden, the J. Vivian, Jr. and Company Building in Laurium, and the Douglass House and Shelden-Dee Block (and the Ransom B. Shelden House) in Houghton.

Civic and government buildings
Another important subset of structures in Houghton County are public buildings.  These buildings were often built with the help of, the mining companies that ran the towns; such was the case with the Calumet Fire Station and the Hancock Town Hall and Fire Hall, both substantial red sandstone structures.  Other government buildings include the South Range Community Building, the Lake Linden Village Hall and Fire Station and of course the Houghton County Courthouse.  Educational buildings include the schools in Chassel and the College Club House and Gymnasium on the campus of Michigan Technological University.

Distinctive churches in the county include Saint Ignatius Loyola Church in Houghton, the First Congregational Church in Lake Linden, and the Jacobsville Finnish Lutheran Church

Listings county-wide

|}

Former listings

|}

See also
 List of Michigan State Historic Sites in Houghton County, Michigan
 List of National Historic Landmarks in Michigan
 National Register of Historic Places listings in Michigan
 Listings in neighboring counties: Baraga, Iron, Keweenaw, Ontonagon

References

External links

 01
.
Houghton
Houghton County, Michigan